is a Japanese manga series by Takeaki Momose, which was later adapted into an anime series, directed by Seiji Kishi and written by Hideki Mitsui. The anime series was also broadcast by Animax, who adapted and dubbed the series into English for broadcast across its English language networks in Southeast Asia and South Asia from February 2007, where the series received its English language premiere.

ADV Films has licensed the rights for the North American release of Magikano on DVD, and released the first volume on December 4, 2007. ADV Films' Anime Network began airing the anime on January 3, 2008 on their Subscription On Demand platform. On March 6, 2008 the anime began airing on their Free On Demand platform. In July 2008, the series became one of over 30 ADV titles to be transferred to Funimation.

Plot
Ayumi Mamiya is a witch cursed to lose her powers but there is one boy who can break the spell and save her. Haruo Yoshikawa thinks he is a normal boy but unknown to him his three sisters are witches who use their magical powers to keep him protected and ignorant about the existence of magic. Now Ayumi must wake up Haruo's latent powers to save herself but his sisters will have none of that.

Characters
 
 
 Haruo is an average junior high school boy who has a perfect attendance record at school and doesn't have any long-term goals aside from living a long life. He lives with his three sisters, and has no idea that they are mahoutsukai (magic users). Haruo has latent magic powers, but he is not aware of this, believing he and his family are perfectly ordinary. His powers are revealed to be extraordinary on two occasions; when a ghost takes over his spirit and is able to channel extreme power through him and when Michiru kidnaps him during a school play and he becomes so angry at how she has hurt his friends he that he awakens and is able to blow apart her castle and transport everyone home along with turning back time so no one except Michiru remembers the event. Maika and his other sisters ensure that Haruo is kept in the dark about them using magic through liberal application of magic memory-erasing hammers (no less than three hammers simultaneously at times). It is showing that this is done so often he occasionally seems aware at some level of the erasal asking if "something happened" and once stating he had a lot of gaps in his memory recently. He seems somewhat naive, and always in the dark about the feelings of people (mainly women who like him) around him. However, he cares about the well being of others. He seems to want for the most part a quiet life he is often showing trying to relax and do normal things such as watch TV or just hang out and seems wary of his sisters antics and reluctant to get involved on schemes but will be kind and always help if he can. Haruo is in his third year of junior high school (grade 9), in classroom B. Halfway through the manga series, he accidentally found out about magic but at first believes that his sisters are possessed demons, until his latent magic powers awaken after a misadventure. However, after this he still has a hard time believing in magic. In the last episode of the anime, Haruo is revealed to be an avatar, or incarnation of the Demon Lord/Maoh. "Haru" means "spring" in Japanese, as he is the oldest in his family.
 
 
 Ayumi Mamiya is a young witch who was cursed during her childhood. The only one who can lift this curse is Haruo Yoshikawa, which forces her to study at the same school and move into the Yoshikawa residence as a maid. For most of the series, Ayumi flirts with and casts spells on Haruo in order to seduce him and "make him a man". Because of this, she and Maika constantly argue and get into fights - which Ayumi inevitably loses. She claims that her curse is the reason for her seduction attempts, although in the last episode, it is revealed that she has truly come to love him.
 
 
 Maika is the oldest daughter of the Yoshikawa family. She can use magic, and loves cooking for her brother and sisters. She has long lilac-coloured hair, often tied back with green ribbons. She is very protective of her brother Haruo, and was immediately suspicious of Ayumi's intentions (which were justified). The others often accuse her of having a brother complex. Hints of this occurs as she tries to get closer to him and even comments on how "hot" he is. As a toddler she "brainwashed" Haruo in his sleep by chanting "Big Brother and Maika together forever" repeatedly, and her usually caring and lady-like personality is replaced by a possessive jealousy whenever any female tries to get close her brother. She is even able to transform into a green-skinned demon when she becomes especially jealous. "Ka" means "summer" in Japanese, as she is the second oldest in the Yoshikawa family.
 
 
 Chiaki is the middle sister of the Yoshikawa family. She can also use magic, and loves working out and eating food. She has long, violet hair, often tied back with a red ribbon. She is clueless, honest, sincere, and completely without guile and malice and the most normal of the sisters.. "Aki" means "Autumn" in Japanese, as she is the third born in her family.
 
 
 Fuyuno is the youngest sister of the Yoshikawa family. She can also use magic and she loves just about anything that involves making money. (Her fantasy is swimming in oodles of cash). This is a subject that makes her adopt the demeanor (and voice) of a Scrooge-like miser. Many times she comes up with excuses for the strange events which occur to non-magic people, and is fantastic at problem solving. She has short periwinkle hair with a yellow and black ribbon. "Fuyu" means "winter" in Japanese, as she is the youngest in her family.
 
 
 A friend of Haruo's from his class. Hajime Hario is generally loud and outspoken, and is always on the lookout for girls. The sound of a rooster call typically follows him due to his red mohawk giving him a rooster-like appearance, but only in the anime. Hajime is one of the two members of the "Supernatural Science Club", and thus is constantly showing up when incidents mainly caused by the witches occur. Because of this, he and Sora are frequent victims of the memory loss hammers.
 
 
 Another friend of Haruo's from his class at school, Sora is a boy with glasses who has no dialogue and speaks by taking pictures. But, somehow others (especially Hajime) knows what he's saying. He is always seen with his camera. In the original manga, Sora did not wear glasses and talked. Sora is one of the two members of the "Supernatural Science Club".
 
 
 Yuri is the school's top idol and the student council president, but she gets some unwelcome competition when Ayumi transfers in. She met Haruo when she was a little girl, and instantly fell in love. She once even made a bento for Haruo, only to be thwarted by Maika. Her hair changes color (black to blue/silver) when she uses her battle magic, and instead of a broom/wand she has a large sword she rides like a surfboard. Yuri is still in love with Haruo, and has indecent dreams about him, and gets irrationally angry when Ayumi is with him. She often claims that Ayumi's behaviour is "Against School Policy" as an excuse to see Haruo, since she, as Student President, must see that all rules are followed. Her name yuri is actually a pun on the genre as many of the female students have the hots for her including the SC vice president. Hajime has even came up with a fantasy fetish in which she and Ayumi are about to kiss.
 
 
 A Catholic witch hunter who thinks that Haruo was sent from heaven and needs protection from witches (especially Ayumi). She works with Ayumi, Yuri, and/or Maika whenever she feels that they have a common cause. Marin is an incompetent and clumsy fool whose attacks inflict more damage on herself than any of the "evil-witches" that she so adamantly hunts. It's unclear whether Marin has deeper feelings for Haruo, or if she just admires him for what she calls "keeping away evil witches". A hint is this was when she fantasized about her and Haruo beating the Yoshikawa sisters together. Marin has never purified any witch (if you don't count the witch she purified in Michiru's world). Many jokes seem to imply she is not as wealthy as others.
 
 
 An enigmatic maid sent by Ayumi's father into the service of the Yoshikawa household, apparently to collect data. An effective maid, she is taciturn and quite able to cause trouble and thwart Ayumi's attempts to seduce Haruo. Her seeming obliviousness to the present conceals a calculating cunning that rivals even Fuyuno's. It is later revealed that she is an artificially-created human. The sound of a cymbal solo - a short musical quotation from The Terminator - sounds whenever she goes into action.
 
 
 Ayumi's younger sister, who is determined to stop Ayumi from breaking her curse and become head of the Mamiya family in her place. She is aware that Haruo's powers extend far beyond the ability to break Ayumi's curse and she intends to use that power to take over the world. Michiru is unbelievably powerful and extremely malevolent. As seen when she took Haruo during the play, her powers surpass those of the other girls combined.
 
 
 Haruo's class teacher, who seems to always be nearby whenever something strange happens. She also always seems to know what is happening. It is later revealed that she is an artificially-created human immune to certain kinds of magic.
 
 
 A manga only character. Melissa is the 10-year-old head of the Maelstrom family, a group of Necromancers. Because of a curse of infertility, they are going extinct. She believes that if she has children with Haruo the curse will be broken so she kidnaps him. When that fails she decides to move next door.

Media

Manga

List of volumes

Anime

Episodes list

Reception

The reception of Magikano varies greatly. Reviews from viewers comment on the anime's fun nature and good use of humour. The use of inappropriate language without censorship and slap-stick humour was well-received by Magikano's audience. However, many viewers also held negative reviews and brought attention to the cliché romantic plot. Others who held the same opinion also commented on the pointless ending, where many fans felt that the series of events used in the conclusion of the story did not match the general overtone exhibited throughout the majority of the anime series.

Anime reviewers such as the Anime News Network and Mania stated that Magikano has potential. However, Anime News Network joined viewers who disliked the anime, commenting that "it seems devoid of any ambition at all". This same network criticized the ending as "pointless and stupid" reflecting on the abrupt conclusion that changes in tone suddenly.

Still, anime reviewers such as activeAnime praise the Magikano series and observe the "racy girls with magical means with more comedy and twists that harem fans can imagine!" (Ellingwood, Holly).

References

External links
 
 Magikano at Funimation

2003 manga
ADV Films
Comedy anime and manga
Funimation
Harem anime and manga
Magical girl anime and manga
Romance anime and manga
Seinen manga
Witchcraft in anime and manga
Witchcraft in written fiction
Witchcraft in television